Beyond Belief is the twelfth studio album of the Christian rock band, Petra. It was released on June 20, 1990.

In this album the band continues to polish the hard rock/arena rock sound the band had been working on their previous efforts before their praise album (On Fire! and This Means War!).

As of late 2011, this is the band's most successful album both critically and commercially, and it is considered by most to be the peak of their discography. The album won the band their first Grammy after five previous nominations, and was certified gold on October 3, 1995. The album was listed at No. 71 in CCM Magazines The 100 Greatest Albums in Christian Music.
The band also released a mini-movie of the same title.

Track listing 

All songs written by Bob Hartman, except where noted.

 "Armed and Dangerous" – 4:06
 "I am on the Rock" (Hartman, John Elefante) – 4:37
 "Creed" – 4:36
 "Beyond Belief" – 5:06
 "Love" – 4:10
 "Underground" (Hartman, J. Elefante) – 4:33
 "Seen and Not Heard" – 3:54
 "Last Daze" – 5:04
 "What's in a Name" – 3:34
 "Prayer" (Hartman, J. Elefante) – 4:15

Awards 

 Won Grammy Award for Best Rock Gospel Album in 1991.
 Won Dove Award for Long Form Music Video in 1990.
 Won Dove Award for Rock Album in 1991.
 Won Dove Award for Rock Recorded Song ("Beyond Belief") in 1991.
 Won Dove Award for Recorded Music Packaging in 1991.

Personnel 
Petra
 John Schlitt – lead vocals, backing vocals 
 Bob Hartman – guitars, arrangements 
 John Lawry – keyboards
 Ronny Cates – bass
 Louie Weaver – drums

Additional musicians
 John Andrew Schreiner – additional keyboards
 John Elefante – background vocals, arrangements 
 Dino Elefante – background vocals, arrangements
 Dave Amato – background vocals
 Walt Harrah and the Los Alamitos Congregational Choir – background vocals on "Love"

Production
 John Elefante – producer, engineer, mixing at Pakaderm Studios, Los Alamitos, California
 Dino Elefante – producer, engineer, mixing at Pakaderm Studios
 Lynn Keesecker – A&R direction
 Mike Mireau – engineer
 Jeff Simmons – assistant engineer
 Bob Ludwig – mastering at Masterdisk, New York City
 Amy Linden – art production coordination
 Buddy Jackson – art direction
 Beth Middleworth – design
 Mark Tucker – photography
 Carol Buckley-Frazier – hair, make-up
 Susan Wakulsky – stylist

Short film 

Prior to the release of the album, Petra released a short film also called Beyond Belief. The film was produced and directed by Stephen Yake and written by Yake, Tom Newman, Andrea Jobe, and Jeff Bates.

The film features six videos of songs featured on the Beyond Belief album intercalated in the plot of the film. The members of the band also make cameo appearances during the film. The project was filmed on location in Tulsa, Oklahoma, Phoenix and Sedona, Arizona, Coos Bay, Oregon, Miami, Florida and Lima, Perú.

Plot 

The film follows Chad Warren (Tony Leech), a young senior in high school, who must face the illness of his brother, David (Jason Rogers) during the summer.

While David is diagnosed with cancer, Chad must compete in a huge track and field competition to get a scholarship at Angelo State. David also insists on Chad mending his relationship with their father, who recently walked out on their family.

Music videos 
The music videos included are:

 "Creed"
 "Seen And Not Heard"
 "Love"
 "Beyond Belief"
 "I Am On the Rock" (Words and music by Bob Hartman and John Elefante)
 "Armed and Dangerous"

All songs are included in the band's album Beyond Belief, and were written by the band's guitarist/founder Bob Hartman, except where noted.

Cast 

 Tony Leech - Chad Warren
 Jason Rogers - David Warren
 Vicci Jo Witty - Mrs. Warren
 Bob Maras - Mr. Warren
 Monte Light - Young Chad
 Adam Maras - Young David
 Larry Smith - Coach
 Tom Holder - Chris

References

External links 

 
 

1990 albums
Petra (band) albums
A&M Records albums
Epic Records albums
1990s English-language films